Valle Lomellina is a comune (municipality) in the Province of Pavia in the Italian region Lombardy, located about 50 km southwest of Milan and about 40 km west of Pavia. As of 31 December 2004, it had a population of 2,224 and an area of 27.1 km².

The municipality of Valle Lomellina contains the frazioni (subdivisions, mainly villages and hamlets) Bordignana, Cascina d'Allona, and Cascina dei Risi.

Valle Lomellina borders the following municipalities: Breme, Candia Lomellina, Cozzo, Sartirana Lomellina, Semiana, Velezzo Lomellina, Zeme.

Demographic evolution

Twin towns
Valle Lomellina is twinned with:

  Fourques, Gard, France, since 1998

References

External links
 www.comune.vallelomellina.pv.it/

Cities and towns in Lombardy